Bradley Grace (born 1982) is an Irish born musician, singer and songwriter, and the bass player for American hardcore band Poison the Well. Grace is the longest standing bass player in the band's history, having joined in 2006. Before that he was the band's guitar tech from 2003.

Early life 
Grace spent his childhood in Saggart, County Dublin, before relocating to Florida in the early 1990s. He is the son of Irish comedian Brendan Grace.

History 
Poison The Well went on a hiatus in 2010 after a long tour schedule in support of their last album The Tropic Rot. During this tour, the band's trailer, along with all their musical equipment, was stolen. Since the hiatus, some members of the band have begun working on different projects although nothing has been formally released. On May 15, 2015, Poison The Well played a sold out reunion show at Music Hall of Williamsburg in Brooklyn. The following day, they performed at the Surf and Skate festival in New Jersey. In an interview with Miami Times, Grace and singer Jeffrey Moreira did not rule out the possibility of future tour plans and a possible new album. Of all of the members of Poison the Well Grace is probably the least influenced by Metal music which can be heard in various elements featured throughout the band's 2009 album, The Tropic Rot. Grace has since released some folk/acoustic work under his full name, Bradley James Grace. In 2019 he performed a version of the John Denver song "This Old Guitar" in honor of his late father Brendan Grace at the Olympia Theatre, Dublin as part of a memorial concert held in his honor. He later recorded the song releasing it on iTunes and donating the proceeds to an Irish organization assisting care-givers of dementia patients, a cause his father had worked closely with.

Grace was credited as an assistant producer on Brooklyn noise pop duo Sleigh Bells' music video "Favorite Transgressions". Derek Miller of Sleigh Bells is also a former guitarist for Poison The Well.

Equipment

Grace is most often associated with playing Fender basses, particularly the American "P" bass. He has also used Jazz basses, including the "Geddy Lee" signature model. He has used several bass heads ranging from a Gallien Kruger 700 RB to an early model Mesa boogie 400+ to numerous SVT heads including reissued and Vintage SVT blue lines. He also often uses two Ampeg 8 x 10 cabinets.

Discography
Solo
"This Old Guitar" - Single, 2019

With Poison the Well
The Tropic Rot - 2009

References

1982 births
Living people
21st-century bass guitarists
21st-century Irish singers
Irish bass guitarists
Irish emigrants to the United States
Irish male singer-songwriters
Poison the Well members